Dallam is a suburb of Warrington, in the Warrington district, in the ceremonial county of Cheshire, England. It was historically in Lancashire but is now in Cheshire. It is home to a Royal Mail rail terminus on the main West Coast Main Line railway, opposite a large Eddie Stobart distribution centre. Most housing is former council housing. It is situated at the terminus of the Warrington Borough Transport number 16 and 16A bus routes.

References

External links
Dallam Community Primary School

Geography of Warrington